The Panjab Digital Library is a voluntary organization digitizing and preserving the cultural heritage of Panjab since 2003. With over 50 million digitized pages, it is the biggest resource of digital material on Panjab. There are many historically significant documents stored and made available online. Its scope covers Sikh and Punjabi culture. The library funded by The Nanakshahi Trust was launched online in August 2009. Its base office is located at Chandigarh, India.

The library's mission is to locate, digitize, preserve, collect and make accessible the accumulated wisdom of the Panjab region, without distinction as to script, language, religion, nationality, or other physical condition.

Coverage
PDL is interested in digitizing anything which is lying in the Panjab region (Panjab, Haryana, Himachal, Kashmir and Pakistan). It is also interested to digitize anything concerning the Panjab region or in Gurmukhi script lying anywhere in the world. PDL is an archive being presented in the form of a library. It digitizes manuscripts from rural areas with the same vigor as it digitizes government files for posterity.

Outreach projects
Library at Virasat-e-Khalsa – PDL signed an agreement with Anandpur Sahib Foundation to develop and manage a library at Virasat-e-Khalsa Museum. PDL plans to establish a library of books related to Panjab's art, culture, and history. Rare manuscripts and old magazines will also become part of it. Amongst all these, newspapers will be kept in a big way. About 15 titles from 1960 onwards will be part of the library. A small library shop to sell interesting books and ephemeral material is also on the agenda. PDL opened this library in May 2016.

Current projects
Digitization Projects
 Punjab State ArchivesExhibitions'''
 Morcha Guru Ka Bagh
 Guru TeghBahadar Sahib

Major institutions digitized
 1. Punjab Languages Department, Patiala
 2. Government Museum and Art Gallery Chandigarh
 3. Beant Singh Memorial, Chandigarh
 4. Central Reserve Police Force (CRPF), Chandigarh
 5. Kurukshetra University, Kurukshetra
 6. St. Stephen's College, Delhi
 7. Punjab Vidhan Sabha, Chandigarh
 8. Punjab Archives Department, Chandigarh
 9. Punjab Heritage Tourism Promotion Board
 10. The Sikh Review, Kolkata
 11. Punjabi Sahitya Academy, Ludhiana
 12. The Tribune, Chandigarh
 13. Ajit, Jalandhar
 14. Punjab Kesri, Jalandhar
 15. Chief Khalsa Diwan, Amritsar
 16. SGPC, Amritsar
 17. DSGMC, New Delhi
 18. Gurduara Angitha Sahib, Patiala
 19. Punjab Virasat Charitable Trust, SAS Nagar
 20. Nirmal Sanskrit Vidyala, Varanasi
 21. Kanya Mahavidyalaya, Jalandhar
 22. Department of Language, Arts & Culture Himachal Pradesh, Shimla
 23. Dev Samaj College, Chandigarh
 23. Madras Regimental Center, Wellington
 24. Himachal Academy of Language, Arts & Culture, Shimla

Major personal libraries digitized
 1. Jathedar Dalip Singh, Malu Nangal
 2. Dr. Surinder Singh, Chandigarh
 3. Sodhi Family, Anandpur Sahib
 4. Mahant Mastan Singh, Dharamkot
 5. Dr. Gurcharan Singh, Patiala
 6. Dr. Man Singh Nirankari, Chandigarh
 7. Dr. Madanjit Kaur, Chandigarh
 8. Brij Mohan Singh, Dehradun
 9. Dera Sewa Panthi, Yamuna Nagar
 10. Prof. Pritam Singh, Patiala
 11. Gurmail Singh, Patiala
 12. Gurtej Singh (Ex. IAS), Chandigarh
 13. Joginder Singh Talwara, Sri Amritsar
 14. Chetan Singh, Patiala
 15. Dalip Singh Jathedar, Mallu Nangal
 16. Dr. Gurdarshan Singh Dhillon
 17. Gurcharanjit Singh Lamba, Jalandhar
 18. Harvinder Singh Phoolka (Advocate, Supreme Court), New Delhi
 19. Mohan Singh, Chandigarh
 20. Mahant Kamaljit Singh, Moga
 21. Prof. Malvinderjit Singh Waraich
 22. Dr. Kirpal Singh, Chandigarh
 23. Jasvinder Singh, Nagpur
 24. Anurag Singh, Ludhiana
 25. Dr. Harnam Singh Shan, Chandigarh
 26. Dr. Jaswant Singh Neki, New Delhi
 27. Dr. Gurdev Singh Sidhu, Chandigarh
 28. Dr. Kanwarjit Singh Kang, Chandigarh
 29. Giani Gurdit Singh, Chandigarh
 30. Baba Sarabjot Singh Bedi, Una
 31. Anup Khosla | Dr. GB Singh, Noida
 32. Navjot Pal Singh Randhawa, IAS, Chandigarh
 33. Bhayee Sikander Singh, Chandigarh
 34. Dr. PC Sharma, Chandigarh
 35. SB Durga, Chandigarh
 36. Princess Suraj DTVI, Chamba
 37. Raja Budhishwar Pal, Nalagarh

and many more public and personal libraries.

Major activities
 2009 Nov - Exhibition "Deposition Dispensation: Digitization Directions" was inaugurated by H.E. Gen (Retd.) Dr. S. F. Rodrigues, PVSM, VSM, Governor of Punjab and Administrator of Chandigarh. A special Monograph was also released on the occasion.
 2009 Dec - Participated and presented a paper in the Parliament of World's Religions at Melbourne, Australia.
 2010 Feb - Participated and presented a paper titled ‘Panjab Digital Library: Revealing the Heritage of Panjab’ International Conference on Digital Libraries at New Delhi in February 2010.
 2010 Feb - A month-long mobile exhibition was organized on Architectural Heritage of Panjab at Rose Festival, Chandigarh. The exhibition was on display from 26 February 2010 to 28 March 2010. The theme of the exhibition was "Unveiling the Architecture of the Greater Panjab".
 2010 Apr - Heritage walk was organized for students of KVRSM School of Chandigarh. About 45 students were taken to Manimajra fort for awareness about the heritage. They were given a lecture about the importance of Heritage.
 2010 Apr - Exhibited heritage of Panjab at Beant Singh Memorial, Chandigarh. The exhibition was visited among others by His Excellency Shri Shiv Raj Patil, Governor of Panjab and Administrator of Chandigarh.
 2011 Aug - A webinar "De-Freezing 1930s Panjab" was presented online. The webinar focused on sharing one of PDL's surprise treasures: photographs were taken by Bhai Dhana Singh on a bicycle tour of Panjab of various shrines. The presenters then attempted to visit those shrines again in modern times and see what had changed over the decades.
 2010 Oct - PDL helped set up a museum at Jagdhari. Sh. Harmohinder Singh Chattha, then Speaker of Haryana Assembly inaugurated in presence of Lt. Gen. (Retd.) Dr. D.D.S. Sandhu, PVSM, VC of Kurukshetra University.
 2010 Nov - Students of DAV College, Yamuna Nagar visited PDL office to have a first-hand experience of behind the scene activities of a digital library and digitization project.
 2011 Oct - The Centre on Studies in Sri Guru Granth Sahib coordinated a workshop on 7–8 October 2011 on "Studies on Sri Guru Granth Sahib: Utilization of Computer and Digital Technology." PDL was honored to be presented as a case study in preserving the heritage and facilitating ongoing studies.
 2012 Feb - Developed a permanent installation of "The Khalsa Raj: Banda Battles & Body Politic" exhibition at Singh Sabha Gurduara in Southhall, UK.
 2012 Apr - Developed and Exhibited "The Khalsa Raj: Banda Battles & Body Politic" exhibition at City Center Library, Surrey
 2013 Jul - In collaboration with HRI Southasia, Panjab Digital Library developed an exhibition LIVED STORIES, EVERYDAY LIVES. The exhibition was displayed for the first time at Punjab Kala Bhawan Chandigarh. Afterward, the exhibition traveled to Daudpur village, Khanna district, Panjab.
 2014 Nov - Organized painting competition and exhibition at Chhapar Chiri, Mohali
 2014 Nov - Helped Punjab Government with the reprinting of Emly Eden's lithographs for Progressive Punjab Summit
 2015 Feb - Honored for extraordinary contribution in the field of Digital Library at a conference organized by Bhutta College of Education. Presented a lecture at the conference.
 2015 Feb - Working with National archives of India to develop policies and standards for digitization.
 2015 Feb - Provided data backup services to Punjab Heritage Tourism Promotion Board for their rare records.
 2015 Feb - Organized an exhibition at Banda Singh Bahadur Memorial at Chhapar Chiri, Mohali
 2015 Nov - Helped Punjab Government with the reprinting of Prince Waldemar's lithographs for Progressive Punjab Summit
 2015 Dec - Signed an agreement with Anandpur Sahib Foundation to develop and operate a library at Virasat-e-Khalsa Museum.
 2016 Dec - In collaboration with Bihar Government organized an exhibition, "Emperor-Prophet Guru Gobind Singh Sahib" at Bihar Museum, Patna
 2017 Feb - Exhibition "Emperor-Prophet Guru Gobind Singh Sahib" at Virasat-e-Khalsa, Anandpur
 2017 Apr - Photographed 150 protected monuments of Panjab
 2017 Nov - Curated an Exhibit titled "Monuments of Panjab" for Guru Gobind Singh Khalsa College, Chandigarh on the occasion of a National Seminar
 2017 Dec - Curated & Produced a portfolio on "Military Tradition of Panjab" for Military Literature Festival
 2018 Mar - Curated an Exhibit titled "Mid-Nineteenth Century: Fall of the Sikh Empire and Transition in Polity and Socio-Cultural Milieu (1839-1849)" at Guru Gobind Singh Khalsa College, Chandigarh on the occasion of a National Seminar
 2018 Mar - Curated a catalog of artifacts for Indian Railways Museum at Shimla
 2018 Nov - Curated and Published "Guns of Glory: Sikh Guns & Inscriptions" for Military Literature Festival, Government of Punjab
 2019 Nov - Curated and organized a visual art exhibition on Guru Nanak Sahib at Sultanpur Lodhi, Government of Punjab
 2019 Dec - Curated and Published a catalog of miniatures on the "Life & Legacy of Guru Nanak Sahib" for Military Literature Festival, Government of Punjab

Growth

* Estimated pages to be digitized by the year end

References

External links
 
Panjab Digital Library at India Today
 Punjab library keeps the past alive online, Live Mint
A Sikh pilgrim's chronicle of gurdwaras across the nation in 1930s, Hindustan Times

Indian digital libraries
Organizations established in 2009
Organisations based in Chandigarh
Punjabi culture
2009 establishments in Chandigarh
Science and technology in Chandigarh
Digital libraries
Libraries established in 2003